The 3rd Time Around is the third studio album by American country music singer Roger Miller. It was released under the Smash Records label in June 1965 (see 1965 in country music). The record reached #1 on the country album charts and #13 on the Billboard 200, his third highest ranking on the pop albums charts, and his only #1 country album.

Four singles were released from the album: "Engine Engine #9," "One Dyin' and a Buryin'", "Kansas City Star", and "The Last Word in Lonesome Is Me". The first three all peaked in the top 10 on the Country singles chart. "Engine, Engine #9" was also a top 10 crossover hit on the Billboard Hot 100 and Hot Adult Contemporary Tracks as was "Kansas City Star" on the latter chart. "The Last Word in Lonesome Is Me" did not fare as well. It was later recorded by Eddy Arnold, whose version was a #2 country hit in 1966, and by NFL quarterback Terry Bradshaw, whose version was also a hit on the country charts.

3rd Time was cited as a return to the "honky tonk roots" of Roger Miller.

Background
After releasing material during the two-day session that brought forth his debut album, and some of the tracks from The Return of Roger Miller, another album from the extra cuts recorded at the session were compiled with a few other songs to produce The 3rd Time. Miller wrote all twelve of the songs on the album, with assistance from Buddy Killen on "I'll Pick Up My Heart (And Go Home)."

Reception

Upon its release, Billboard designated The 3rd Time Around a "Spotlight Pick" and identified it as "another hot contender full of clever original compositions." Allmusic gave the album five stars, lauding it for the "extra effort" put in "to make it sound fresh and different." The publication observed that "at least half of the dozen titles here are among his most famous." The tracks "Swiss Maid," "Big Harlan Taylor", and "The Last Word in Lonesome Is Me" were cited as presenting a "range of themes and characters" consistent with Miller's "individualistic style."  "Kansas City Star" was described as a "rockabilly-flavored classic."

Track listing

Chart positions

Singles

Personnel

Roger Miller - guitar, vocals
Ray Edenton – guitar  
Buddy Harman – drums  
Bob Moore – bass

References

1965 albums
Roger Miller albums
Albums produced by Jerry Kennedy
Smash Records albums